The 2006 Sunderland Council election took place on 4 May 2006 to elect members of Sunderland City Council in Tyne and Wear, England. One third of the Council was up for election and the Labour Party stayed in overall control.

Campaign
Before the election the council was composed of 60 Labour, 12 Conservative, 2 Liberal Democrat and 1 independent councillors. In the period since the previous local elections in May 2004, there had been two by-elections, in Barnes Ward and Millfield Ward (with seats held by the Conservatives and Liberal Democrats respectively), and Doxford councillor Mike Tansey had left the Labour Party to sit as an Independent.

In total 99 candidates stood in the election for the 25 seats that were being contested, with the Labour Party, Conservative Party and British National Party contesting every seat. Other candidates included 22 from the Liberal Democrats and 1 from the Official Monster Raving Loony Party. The council was safe for Labour, but the Conservatives were hoping to make gains in the wards of Doxford, St Peters, Washington East and Washington South.

Sunderland was one of 4 local councils which had early polling stations available so voters could vote up to 2 weeks before the election.

Election results
The results saw Labour keep a strong majority on the council after finishing just one seat down with 59 councillors. The Labour leader of the council, Robert Symonds, was among those to hold his seat in Castle ward, but the party did lose 2 seats including St Peters to the Conservatives. The other Labour loss was to the Liberal Democrats in Millfield, but Labour also gained Washington South from the Liberal Democrats. This meant the Conservatives had 13 seats, the Liberal Democrats 2 and 1 independent. Meanwhile, the British National Party failed to win any seats, but did win almost 15% of the vote. Overall turnout was 32.2%, with 1,436 voters having used the early voting scheme, while 30,304 people used postal voting, which was 67.54% of those registered to vote by post.

Following the election the leader of the Conservative group, Peter Wood, was challenged for the leadership by Lee Martin, but held on by one vote.

This resulted in the following composition of the Council:

Ward by ward results

References

2006 English local elections
2006
21st century in Tyne and Wear